David John Mark (born 28 December 1977) is an English novelist and journalist, known for his DS Aector McAvoy series of crime fiction books.

Mark's debut novel, entitled Dark Winter, became one of Richard & Judy's Book Club picks in 2012, helping to raise its profile. It sat alongside novels such as Gone Girl and The Fault in Our Stars. To date, the book has sold hundreds of thousands of copies in all formats and it has been critically acclaimed around the world, as well as being translated into six languages. A major TV company optioned the series.

Follow-up Original Skin was released in April 2013. It continues the story of DS Aector McAvoy, a Scottish policeman based in Hull's Serious And Organised Crime Unit, following him as he investigates suspicious deaths within the city's sleazy underworld, while contending with changing politics within the force. The third novel, Sorrow Bound  was also a critical success. Mark's follow up,  Taking Pity, were acclaimed around the world.

In 2016 he signed with Mulholland Books, an imprint of Hodder and Stoughton. He released McAvoy novels Dead Pretty, Scorched Earth, Cruel Mercy and Cold Bones, as well as historical novel The Zealot's Bones, which was one of the Sunday Times Books of the Year in 2016. 

Before signing his publishing deal with Quercus, Mark was a journalist specialising in crime reporting for a number of newspapers and agencies - most notably for the Yorkshire Post in their Hull office. He spent time as a showbusiness reporter for the Press Association, though he has claimed he loathed the experience.

In 2018, a stage adaptation of Dark Winter received its world premiere in Hull. Tickets sold out in days.  

Last year he signed a deal with publishers Severn House. His first book, The Mausoleum, has been a critical success and will be released in paperback next year.   

He lives in Northumberland with his family.

Books

DS Aector McAvoy series

References

External links
 

1977 births
Living people
English crime fiction writers
English male journalists
People from Carlisle, Cumbria
British male novelists